The Copleston–Russell debate is an exchange concerning the existence of God between Frederick Copleston and Bertrand Russell broadcast on the BBC Third Programme on 28 January 1948 and again in April 1959. The debate centers on two points: the metaphysical and moral arguments for the existence of God. According to Graham Oppy and Nick Trakakis, the arguments used in this debate would typify the arguments presented by theists and atheists in the latter half of the 20th century, with Russell's approach often being used by atheists in the late 20th century. 

A text of the broadcast solicited by Michael Polanyi appeared in the final Autumn 1948 issue of the short-lived Humanitas, A University Quarterly journal. This was reprinted in the British edition of Russell's Why I Am Not A Christian and Other Essays on Religion and Related Subjects (1957) and in numerous anthologies since.

Overview
In the 1948 BBC Radio Debate between Bertrand Russell and Frederick Copleston, Copleston's position was that God's existence could be proven philosophically. Russell's position was that of an agnostic (in the sense in which both he and Copleston understood the term) as he thought that the non-existence of God could not be proven. Whether Russell was an agnostic or atheist is a question he had previously addressed in 1947. Speaking with fellow philosophers, he had said, he would identify himself as agnostic. But to "the ordinary man in the street" he would identify himself as an atheist as he thought the Christian God no more likely to exist than gods of Ancient Greece and he thought neither "sufficiently probable to be worth serious consideration".

Copleston argued that the existence of God can be proved from contingency, and thought that only the existence of God would make sense of human's moral and religious experience:

Russell however found both arguments unconvincing. He contended that Copleston's argument from contingency is a fallacy, and that there are better explanations for our moral and religious experience:

Notes

External links

Philosophy
Analytic philosophy
Philosophical debates
Arguments against the existence of God
Arguments for the existence of God
Religious controversies in radio
Religious controversies in the United Kingdom